Poppy Harlow (born Katharine Julia Harlow; May 2, 1982) is an American journalist, best known for her reporting at CNN and Forbes.com. She is an anchor of CNN This Morning and is based at CNN's New York news bureau. She was previously co-anchor of CNN Newsroom weekdays from 9 A.M. to 11 A.M., a business correspondent at CNN, CNN International and HLN; an anchor for CNNMoney.com; and a Forbes.com Video Network anchor, reporter and producer.

Early life and education
Harlow was born and raised in Minneapolis, Minnesota. Her father, attorney James Lee Harlow, died when she was 15. Her mother is Mary Louise Baird.

Harlow graduated from The Blake School, a private co-educational college preparatory school in Minneapolis, in 2001. She then graduated magna cum laude, Phi Beta Kappa, from Columbia University, with a bachelor's degree in Political Science and Middle Eastern studies. Harlow's nickname “Poppy” is a childhood nickname that stuck. She earned a Master of Studies in Law (M.S.L.) degree from Yale Law School in 2022.

Career

After interning at CBS while in college, Harlow continued working for CBS MarketWatch and as an assistant producer for CBS Newspath after graduation. She then became an anchor and reporter for NY1 News' Local Edition. While at NY1, her news beat covered Staten Island and New Jersey, including reports on local politics, the economy and local cultural events.

In September 2007, Harlow was hired by Forbes.com Video Network, where her area of coverage expanded to fashion, entertainment and business topics.

Harlow joined CNN in 2008 and served as the anchor for CNNMoney.com and reported for CNN, CNN International and HLN. She was named a New York-based CNN correspondent in April 2012. She has won the Gracie Award for best online investigative program or feature and SABEW's Best in Business award.

In 2013, while reporting on the conviction of two Steubenville, Ohio, high school football players for the rape of a 16-year-old, Harlow stated that it was "incredibly difficult, even for an outsider like me, to watch what happened as these two young men that had such promising futures, star football players, very good students, literally watched as they believed their lives fell apart ... [Ma'lik Richmond] collapsed [and told his attorney,] 'My life is over. No one is going to want me now.'" This apparent expression of sympathy for the rapists provoked widespread criticism. A petition requesting that CNN apologize on the air for sympathizing with the Steubenville rapists received over 250,000 signatures within two days of CNN's report.

Harlow also fills in for Richard Quest on CNN International.

On December 28, 2015, Harlow passed out briefly while live on the air from the anchor desk. She soon reappeared on air and said she had gotten a little hot and was fine. She later tweeted from the hospital that she and her unborn daughter were well.

Beginning on February 6, 2017, Harlow and Jim Sciutto took over as the new co-anchors of CNN Newsroom from 9 A.M. to 11 A.M. every morning due to Carol Costello's move to HLN. 

On September 15, 2022, it was announced that Harlow will co-anchor the new CNN revamped morning show with Don Lemon and Kaitlan Collins later in the year. She will also leave her 9 a.m. to 11 a.m. ET role on CNN Newsroom. On October 12, 2022, it was announced that the morning show will be named CNN This Morning.

Personal life
Harlow is married to Sinisa Babcic. The couple have two children; a daughter born in April 2016 and a son born in February 2018. She was awarded a John Jay Award from her alma mater, Columbia College, in 2022.

References

External links
 Poppy Harlow at CNN.com

1982 births
Living people
Columbia College (New York) alumni
Yale Law School alumni
CNN people
Journalists from New York City
American television reporters and correspondents
People from the Minneapolis–Saint Paul metropolitan area
American broadcast news analysts
American women television journalists
21st-century American women